ProMedica Bay Park Hospital (formerly Bay Park Community Hospital) is a public hospital in Oregon, Ohio that is part of the ProMedica Health System. The hospital was founded in 1999.

References

External links
 

Hospital buildings completed in 1999
1999 establishments in Ohio
Buildings and structures in Lucas County, Ohio
Hospitals established in 1999
Hospitals in Ohio